Italo Valentino Bisoglio (May 7, 1926 – October 18, 2021) was an American character actor primarily known for his work on television.

Biography
Bisoglio was born in New York City, New York, on May 7, 1926.

He may be best known for his recurring role as restaurateur "Danny Tovo" in the popular medical drama television series Quincy, M.E. from 1976 to 1983. During his television acting career, Bisoglio appeared in numerous television programs during the 1960s and  1970s including. The Doctors, McCloud, M*A*S*H (three episodes), All in the Family, Barney Miller, The Mary Tyler Moore Show, Roll Out, Kojak,  Baretta,  McMillan & Wife, and The Rockford Files. In 1986, Bisoglio appeared on Miami Vice (3x11) in an episode titled "Forgive Us our Debts".

In 2002, he appeared in his final television role as Murf Lupo in The Sopranos, appearing in three episodes.

From his work in film, Bisoglio is perhaps best known for his role as "Frank Manero Sr.", the volatile father of "Tony Manero" (John Travolta) in the 1977 film Saturday Night Fever.

His other film credits include an uncredited role in Serpico (1973),  as well as roles in No Way to Treat a Lady (1968), The Brotherhood (1968), The Don Is Dead (1973), Linda Lovelace for President (1975), The Hindenburg (1975), St. Ives (1976), and The Frisco Kid (1979).

Bisoglio died of Lewy body dementia at the age of 95 at his home in Los Olivos, California, on October 18, 2021.

Filmography

References

External links
 
 
 
 Off-Broadway Database entry

1926 births
2021 deaths
20th-century American male actors
Actors Studio alumni
American male film actors
American male stage actors
American male television actors
American people of Italian descent
Male actors from New York City
Deaths from dementia in California
Deaths from Lewy body dementia